Sarangesa maxima is a species of butterfly in the family Hesperiidae. It is found in the Democratic Republic of the Congo (Katanga Province) and Zambia. The habitat consists of Brachystegia woodland.

References

Butterflies described in 1910
Celaenorrhinini